Thunderbolt, previously known as Pippin, is a wooden roller coaster located at Kennywood amusement park near Pittsburgh in West Mifflin, Pennsylvania. It was originally built and designed by John A. Miller and opened in 1924. It was later renovated for the 1968 season, which involved a major track expansion designed by Andy Vettel. It reopened to the public as Thunderbolt. It is partially known for being one of the few rides at Kennywood to require a partner.

History

Pippin
In 1924, Pippin opened with trains by Miller and Baker. The original trains were replaced by three Century Flyer trains built by the National Amusement Device Company in 1958, which remain in operation today on the Thunderbolt.

Thunderbolt
The Pippin roller coaster was expanded and partially rebuilt as the Thunderbolt in 1968. Most of the ride was left intact except for the double dip, station, and station turn-around to the first hill which were removed for the addition of the new front helix hills. The four original drops down a ravine were incorporated in the Andy Vettel-designed Thunderbolt coaster.

In 1969, a small "speed bump" hill was removed from the inner helix near the loading station. The Thunderbolt was rated the #1 roller coaster by the New York Times in 1974.

On May 17, 1968, A 15-year old Greensburg boy died after a fall from the roller coaster. The exact cause of death was under investigation but never confirmed.

In 1991, the tunnel located at the end of the first dip was removed, providing for a view of Steel Phantom. In 1998, for Kennywood's 100th anniversary, the headlights on the front of the trains were restored when the trains themselves were refurbished.

In 1999, an accident happened when operators failed to brake the train coming into the station, causing a collision with the train being loaded. Thirty people were injured in the crash. After the accident the headlights on the cars were removed partially due to the vibration of the cars.

Installation of Phantom's Revenge resulted in Thunderbolt being closed for a few weeks in 2001 so that the new ride could be built through the structure near the Turtle Ride. Phantom's Revenge retains Steel Phantom's drop through the Thunderbolt. In 2006, the trains could be seen sporting the famous T-bolt logo on the fronts of the cars where the center headlights had been.

Ride experience

A feature of the Thunderbolt is that after departing from the station, the train does not immediately go up the lift hill as on most coasters. Instead, it goes into the first drop, and the lift hill is in the middle of the ride after the second drop. After this drop is a tight bend which results in the rider on the right squishing the rider on the left because there is no seat divider. Kennywood tells guests to have the smaller rider sit on the right to avoid larger riders squishing smaller riders. After this, riders experience several turns and hills before returning to the station.

Awards and Rankings

Thunderbolt is an ACE Coaster Classic and Coaster Landmark.

References

External links 
 

Kennywood